Kfar Kama is a Circassian town located in the Lower Galilee of Israel's northern district, located along road 767, that leads from Kfar Tavor to the Kinneret. It is one of the only two Circassian towns in Israel, the other being Rehaniya. The residents of the town are descended from the Shapsug tribe exilees from Circassia. In 2008, the town had a population of 2,900.

History

Antiquity
Archaeologists have proposed that Kfar Kama was the village Helenoupolis that Constantine established in honor of his mother Helen. Excavations carried out in 1961 and 1963 revealed 4th century tombs. Two churches dated to the early 6th century, one dedicated to Saint Thecla, were uncovered, with multicolored mosaics of floral, animal and geometric patterns.

In the Crusader period it was known as Kapharchemme or Capharkeme.
Ruins and parts of five limestone columns were  found in addition to a circular basalt olive-press and cisterns.

In 2020, a team of archaeologists led by Nurit Feig of the Israel Antiquities Authority discovered 6th-century church remains. The excavators also revealed painted floor mosaics showing geometric shapes and blue, black, and red floral patterns. The dimensions of the main part of the church are 12 by 36 metres. Several other rooms were unearthed near the church. According to archeologist Shani Libbi, additional rooms in the area have been revealed by ground penetrating radar.

Ottoman Empire

In 1596, Kfar Kama appeared in Ottoman tax registers as a village in the Nahiya of Tiberias in the Liwa of Safad. It had a population of 34 Muslim households and  paid a fixed tax rate of 25% on agricultural products, which included  wheat, barley, summer crops, cotton, and goats or beehives; a total of 5,450 akçe.

A map from Napoleon's invasion of 1799 by Pierre Jacotin  showed the place, named as El Hadaci. In 1838, it was mentioned as a village in the Tiberias district.

In 1870s, the village was described as having basalt stone houses and a population of 200 Moslems living on a plain of arable soil.

In 1878, a group of 1,150 Circassian immigrants from the Adyghe tribe Shapsugs who were exiled from the Caucasus by the Russians to the Ottoman Empire due to the Russian-Circassian War settled in the village. Initially they made their living by raising animals, but later became farmers. The first school was established about 1880.

A population survey in 1887 found 1,150 inhabitants, all Circassian Muslims.

British Mandate 

At the time of the 1922 census of Palestine by the British Mandate authorities, Kfar Kama had a population of 670 Muslims and 7 Christians, decreasing slightly in the 1931 census to 644, one Christian and the rest Muslims, in a total of 169 houses.

In 1945 census by the Mandate, the population was 660 people (all Muslims) and the land area was 8,819 dunams. Of this, 8,293 dunams were allocated to cereal farming, while 108 dunams were built-up (urban) land.

Israel 

Kfar Kama is one of two Circassian villages in Israel. The other one is Rehaniya. The Circassians are Muslims, who unlike the main Israeli Arab Muslim minority, perform military service in the Israeli Defense Forces. The village school teaches in Circassian, Hebrew, Arabic and English.

A Center for Circassian Heritage is situated in the village.

Notable people 

 Izhak Nash (born 1989), a Circassian Israeli footballer currently playing for Hapoel Ironi Baqa al-Gharbiyye
 Bibras Natcho (born 1988), a Circassian Israeli footballer currently playing in Europe and the captain of the Israeli national football team
 Nili Natkho (1982–2004), a Circassian Israeli basketball player who played for Maccabi Raanana and Elitzur Ramla

Shapsug families  

 Abrag
 Ashmuz/Achmuzh
 Bghana
 Bat
 Blanghaps
 Batwash
 Jandar
 Gorkozh
 Zazi
 Kobla
 Qal
 Qatizh
 Lauz
 Libai/Labai
 Nago
 Natkho
 Nash
 Napso
 Thawcho
 Hazal
 Hutazh
 Hadish
 Hako/Hakho
 Shamsi
 Choshha/Shoshha
 Shogan
 Shaga
 Sagas/Shagash
 Shhalakhwa.

Other families  
 Abzah
 Boshnakh
 Bazdug/Bzhedug
 Yadig
 Hatukai
 Tsai
 Shapsugh.
 Zoabi
 Masharqa

See also 
 Kfar Kama Adyghe dialect
 Circassians in Israel

References

Bibliography

External links

 Kfar Kama local council
 The World Circassian Heritage Center
Survey of Western Palestine, Map 6:  IAA, Wikimedia commons
 Welcome To Kafr Kama

Circassian communities
Circassians in Israel
Populated places established in 1878
Local councils in Northern District (Israel)
1878 establishments in Ottoman Syria
Circassian diaspora
Villages in Israel
Lower Galilee